The 2022 Calcutta Football League Premier Division was the 124th overall season of the two highest state-level football divisions of West Bengal. The division consists of two tiers within it: Premier Division A and Premier Division B.

Premier Division A

The first stage of the Premier Division A has been held from 2nd August till September and the Super Six is supposed to be held afterwards. Mohammedan are the defending champions of Premier Division A.

Change in format
The round-robin format had been reinstated after a short season of round-robin cum knock-out format last year due to COVID-19 pandemic, but the league has been divided into two stages so as to accommodate the Kolkata's Big Three–ATK Mohun Bagan, East Bengal and Mohammedan–according to national and continental games schedule. The first stage is played by eleven teams, out of which the top three in the points table would qualify for the Super Six, wherein the three teams would be joined by the Big Three and the top team in the table at the end of the stage would be declared as the Calcutta Premier Division A champion.

Available venues
 Amal Datta Krirangan, Dum Dum
 Bankimanjali Stadium, Naihati
 Canning Stadium, Canning
 East Bengal-Aryan Ground, Kolkata
 Kalyani Stadium, Kalyani
 Kakinara Narayanpur Ground, Bhatpara
 Kishore Bharati Krirangan, Kolkata
 Netaji Sports Complex, Rajpur Sonarpur
 Rabindra Sarobar Stadium, Kolkata
 Royal Park Stadium, Barrackpore
 Sailen Manna Stadium, Howrah
 Vivekananda Stadium, Khardah

Teams

Foreign players

First stage

Standings

Results

Positions by round

Results by games

Super Six
ATK Mohun Bagan withdrew from the league, for the second time in a row, two days prior to their first game on 26 September against Bhawanipore. They sent a letter to IFA, citing their lack of a reserve squad and players not being allowed by FSDL to play any other tournament during ISL as the reasons for their withdrawal. IFA decided to continue Super Six with only five teams instead of promoting the fourth placed team in the First Stage.

Standings

Results

Positions by round

Results by games

Season statistics

Top scorers 
As of 30 September 2022

Hat-tricks 
Note: In the result, the score of the player's team is mentioned before.

Clean sheets

Premier Division B

This year the league followed the double round-robin format after a gap of two years due to COVID-19 pandemic. Kalighat MS and Asos Rainbow were relegated from the Premier Division A last time it was held, while Wari and Police AC were promoted from the CFL 1st Division.

Standings
<onlyinclude>

<noinclude><noinclude>

References

Calcutta Premier Division
2022–23 in Indian football leagues
2022–23 in Indian football